Walter George  (20 September 1847 – 2 November 1938) was an English first-class cricketer who played for Kent County Cricket Club in 1875.

George was born at Selling near Faversham in Kent in 1847. He played for MCC in 1872 but did not make his first-class cricket debut until 1875 when he played five times for Kent as a bowler. George was a  left-arm fast-medium roundarm bowler and took 22 first-class wickets in his five matches. He took 6 wickets for 32 runs against Hampshire and 7 for 86 against Derbyshire.

George's last known match was for Lord Harris' XI at Faversham in 1879. He died at Bell Green near Sydenham in Kent in 1938 at the age of 91.

References

External links

1847 births
1938 deaths
English cricketers
Kent cricketers